ʿAmr ibn Hishām al-Makhzūmī, (570 – 13 March 624), also known as Abu Jahl (lit. 'Father of Ignorance'), was one of the Meccan polytheist pagan leaders from the Quraysh known for his opposition towards the Islamic prophet Muhammad and the early Muslims in Mecca.

He was brother of Umar Ibn Abi Rabi'ah and one of the arch-enemies of Muhammad and the flag-bearer of opposition towards Islam and the early Muslims. Islam views him as having malevolence and enmity to such an extent that Muhammad gave him the title of "The Pharaoh of this Ummah". Muhammad said, “He who calls Abu Jahl 'Abu Hakam' has made a serious mistake. He should seek forgiveness from Allah for this.”

Contrary to general misconception, ibn Hisham was not an uncle (as was Abu Lahab) or another blood relative of Muhammad. Muhammad belonged to the Banu Hashim clan of the Quraysh tribe, and ibn Hisham belonged to the Banu Makhzum clan of the Quraysh. Rather Ibn Hisham was a maternal uncle of Umar. Amr ibn Hisham was also known as Asad al-ahlaf, as he was the lion of the opposing groups that had sworn to fight against Islam and Muhammad.

Abu Jahl was fatally and badly wounded by Mu‘awwidh ibn ‘Afrā’ and Mu'ādh ibn 'Amr ibn al-Jamūḥ and eventually killed by Abdullah ibn Masud on March 13, 624, when he died fighting the Muslims in the Battle of Badr.

Name
His epithet was Abū l-Ḥakam (أبو الحكم) (literally "father of wise judgments") as he was considered a man of deep wisdom by the pagans, cunning and understanding by the elders of Quraysh for which they trusted his opinion and relied on him as an elite member of their assembly. Even at the age of thirty, he used to attend the special assemblies held at Dār’ an-Nadwa, the residence owned by Ḥakīm ibn Ḥizām, although the rule of age of entry to these private assemblies was at least forty.

‘Amr ibn Hishām showed relentless animosity to Muhammad and rejected his message. Therefore, Muhammad referred him as Abū Jahl (أبو جهل) (literally "father of ignorance").  ‘Amr ibn Hishām was also called Ibn al-Ḥanẓalīya from his mother's side.

Family

Parents and siblings 
His father was Hisham ibn al-Mughirah and his mother was Asma bint Makhrabah ibn Jandal al-Tamimiya, who early to converted being Muslim. He had eight full-siblings, they were:

1. Salama ibn Hisham

2. Urwah ibn Hisham

3. Khalid ibn Hisham

4. Harith ibn Hisham, husband of Fatima bint al-Walid ibn Mugira and father of Umm Hakim (Zara), Abu Sa'd (Sa'id), Abdul Rahman, Mugira and Abd-Allah.

5. al-As ibn Hisham, husband of Sara bint Huqayq and father of Khalid and Walid.

6. Hantamah bint Hisham, wife of Khattab ibn Nufayl and mother of Umar, Fatimah, Zayd and Safiyya.

7. Umm Harmala bint Hisham, wife of al-'As ibn Wa'il and mother of Hisham.

8. Ayyash ibn Abi Rabiah (maternal brother)

Wife and children 
His first wife was Mujalidya bint Amr ibn Umayr ibn Ma'bad ibn Zurara. They had three sons.

1. 'Ikrimah, husband of Umm Hakim bint al-Harith

2. Zurara

3. Tamimi

His second wife was Arwa bint Abi al-As ibn Umayya. They had eight daughters.

1. Sakhra

2. Asma

3. Jamila

4. Umm Hakim (Hakima)

5. Umm Sa'id (Sa'ida)

6. Juwayriya

7. Hunfa'

8. Umm Habib (Habiba)

Identification mark
Amr ibn Hisham had a trace of a scar on his knee which helped 'Abdullah ibn Mas'ūd to identify him among the slain and wounded soldiers of Quraysh in the battlefield of Badr.

'Amr ibn Hishām was almost the same age of Muhammad. Once in their youth, they had been pressed together at the table of 'Abdullah ibn Jud'ān at-Taymī. Muhammad was thinner than ibn Hisham and gave him a push which sent him to his knees and one of them was scratched so deeply that it left a permanent scar.

After Muhammad announced his prophecy (c 613)
'Amr was among the chieftains that in varying degree kept a relentless hostility towards the Muslims.
Abu Jahl showed fierce opposition against Muhammad when he began preaching publicly. The people of Mecca were mostly devout and were already familiar with the Abrahamic faith as descendants of Is°ma‘īl. They stuck to the social and religious traditions of the community prevalent since the time of his forefathers. However, the following causes of dissension created hostility towards Muhammad:

Power struggle between Banū Makhzūm and Banū ‘Abd Manāf
Abu Jahl once secretly went out by night to listen to Muhammad as he was praying in his house while Abu Sufyan and Al-Akhnas ibn Shurayq also did the same thing. Every one of them chose a place to sit where he could listen, and none knew where his fellow was sitting. So they passed the night listening to him, until as the dawn rose, they dispersed. On their way home they met and reproached one another, and one said to the other, 'Don't do it again, for if one of the light-minded fools sees you, you will arouse suspicion in his mind.' Yet they continued doing this for the next two days.

Abu Jahl later told al-Akhnas ibn Sharīq, “We competed with Banū ‘Abd Manāf in everything to attain status and nobility. They fed people, so we also fed people. They gave charity, so we also gave charity. They looked after people; so did we.  We did these until we became equal. And now they say, ‘A prophet has come from us who receives revelations from the sky’ How can we possibly be able to compete with this?  By Allah, we will never believe in him and we will never accept his message!”

Al-Mughīrah ibn Shu‘bah, a man from aṭ-Ṭā’if, once visited Makkah. He was walking with Abū Jahl ibn Hishām in the streets when they came across Muhammad. Muhammad invited ‘Amr ibn Hishām to Islam by saying, “Why don't you accept Islam and believe me as the Messenger of Allah?” ‘Amr ibn Hishām said, “O Muhammad, when are you going to stop cursing our gods? If you want us to testify that you have fulfilled your mission, we will testify for you. And if I knew that you are telling the truth, I would have already followed you.” Muhammad then left. ‘Amr ibn Hishām looked at al-Mughīrah and said, “I know that he is telling the truth, but there is something holding me back. The descendants of Quṣayy ibn Kilāb ibn Murrah [whereas Banū Makhzūm was the descendant of Yaqaẓah ibn Murrah] wanted al-Ḥijābah (Guardianship of al-Ka‘bah & preservation of its key), as-Siqāyah (Custody of Zamzam & catering the pilgrims during the Ḥajj), al-Ifādah (Authority of trade & commerce), al-Liwā’ (Authority of the banner of battles), the authority of armed forces and an-Nadwah (Assembly of the Quraysh). We sacrificed all in favor of them [Banū Makhzūm was only in charge of the cavalry, Khālid ibn Walīd being its commander] and started picking up & competing with them. When we are running neck to neck, they say ‘We have a prophet among us’; How can we compete with that? By Allah, we are never going to accept this.”

Persecution of converts 
Abu Jahl stirred up the Meccans against the Muslims. When he heard that a man had become a Muslim, if he was a man of social importance and had relations to defend him, he reprimanded him and poured scorn on him, saying, 'You have forsaken the religion of your father who was better than you. We will declare you a blockhead and brand you as a fool, and destroy your reputation.' If he was a merchant he said, 'we will boycott your goods and reduce you to beggary.' If he was a person of no social importance, he beat him and incited people against him. Therefore, many converted slaves had to suffer the extreme savagery of Abu Jahl.

It has been told that Amr ibn Hisham often put heavy stones on the backs of his slaves if they made a mistake. Convert slaves belonging to the polytheist Quraysh received the harshest punishment. Abu Jahl beat Ḥarīthah bint al-Mu‘ammil, one such slave, for her conversion to such an extent that she lost her eyesight. He also attacked Sumayyah bint Khayyat, the mother of ‘Ammār ibn Yasir, and inflicted on her mortal wounds by stabbing her with a spear in her private parts. She was the first Muslim to meet martyrdom in the cause of Islam. Abu Jahl also persecuted Ammar's father Yasir ibn Amir and his brother Abdullah and tortured them to death right in front of his eyes.

Abu Jahl had once clawed at ‘Abdullah ibn Mas‘ūd and punched him in Mecca.

The Man from Banu Irāsh 
The harassment of Abu Jahl was not only directed to his own people, but his misdemeanor extended to the people outside of Mecca also.
 
Once a man from the tribe of Irāsh came to Mecca complaining that Abu Jahl had bought some camels from him without paying him back. When the Irāshi man asked people to help him, they referred him to Muhammad with the intention of stirring up an argument. Muhammad brought him to Abu Jahl's house and asked him to give the Irāshi man's money that he owed him. Abu Jahl immediately came back with the money with his face looking extremely pale and timid. The disappointed Quraysh blamed Abu Jahl with sarcasm later on. He said, “Woe unto you all! As soon as I heard the knock on my door, I heard a terrifying sound which filled me with awe. When I looked to see what it was, it was the most colossal and vicious camel I had ever seen towering over my head. By Allah, if I had delayed or refused it would have devoured me alive!”

Abu Jahl condemned Christian converts 
While Muhammad was in Mecca some twenty Christians came to him from Abyssinia (or Najrān) when they heard news of him. Muhammad answered all their questions and read the Quran to them. Their eyes flowed with tears and they accepted Islam. Abu Jahl intercepted them as they were leaving, saying, 'God, what a wretched band you are! Your people at home sent you to bring them information about the fellow, and as soon as you sat with him you renounced your religion and believed what he said. We don't know a more asinine band than you'. They answered: 'Peace be on you. We will not engage in foolish controversy with you. We have our religion and you have yours. We have not been remiss in seeking what is best.'

Hostility to Muhammad 
One day Abu Jahl declared, "I call God to witness that I will wait for him tomorrow with a stone which I can hardly lift and when he prostrates himself in prayer I will split his skull with it. Betray me or defend me, let the Banū 'Abdu Manāf do what they like after that." The Qurayshi people said that they would never betray him on any account, and he could carry on with his project. When morning came Abu Jahl took a stone and sat in wait for Muhammad. The apostle rose to pray while Quraysh sat in their meeting, waiting for what Abu Jahl was to do. When the apostle prostrated himself, Abu Jahl took up the stone and went towards him, until when he got near him, he turned back in flight, pale with terror, and his hand had withered upon the stone, so that he cast the stone from his hand. The Quraysh asked him what had happened, and he replied that when he got near him a camel's stallion got in his way. "By God", he said, "I have never seen anything like his head, shoulders, and teeth on any stallion before, and he made as though he would eat me."

Narrated ‘Abdullah ibn ‘Abbas: Abu Jahl said, "If I see Muhammad praying at the Ka'ba, I will tread on his neck." When the Prophet heard of that, he said, "If he does so, the Angels will snatch him away."

Narrated 'Abdullah bin Mas'ud: Once the Prophet was offering prayers at the Ka'ba. Abu Jahl was sitting with some of his companions. One of them said to the others, "Who amongst you will bring the entrails of a camel of Bani so and so and put it on the back of Muhammad, when he prostrates?" The most unfortunate of them got up and brought it. He waited till the Prophet prostrated and then placed it on his back between his shoulders. I was watching but could not do anything. I wish I had some people with me to hold out against them. They started laughing and falling on one another. Allah's Apostle was in prostration and he did not lift his head up till Fatima (Prophet's daughter) came and threw that (camel's abdominal contents) away from his back. He raised his head and said thrice, "O Allah! Punish Quraish." So it was hard for Abu Jahl and his companions when the Prophet invoked Allah against them as they had a conviction that the prayers and invocations were accepted in this city (Mecca). The Prophet said, "O Allah! Punish Abu Jahl, 'Utba bin Rabī'a, Shaiba bin Rabī'a, Al-Walīd bin 'Utba, Umaiya bin Khalaf, and 'Uqba bin Abu Mu'īṭ (and he mentioned the seventh whose name I cannot recall). By Allah in Whose Hands my life is, I saw the dead bodies of those persons who were counted by Allah's Apostle in the Qalib (one of the wells) of Badr.

Disbelieving in Muhammad's miracles

Splitting of the moon 
Muslim legend relates that Quraysh polytheists demanded Muhammad to perform most unlikely things possible to prove his prophethood. Once Abu Jahl, along with other leaders including al-Walīd ibn al-Mughīrah, al-‘Āṣ ibn Wā’il, al-‘Āṣ ibn Hishām, Aswad ibn ‘Abd Yaghūth, al-Aswad ibn al-Muṭṭalib, Zam‘ah ibn Aswad, an-Naḍr ibn al-Ḥārith asked Muhammad, “If you truly are a prophet, then split the moon in half so that one half will appear over Mount Abu Qubais and the other over Mount Quayqian.” Muhammad asked, “If I do it, will you become Muslims?” They agreed. On the 14th night, when it was full moon, Muhammad prayed to Allah to give him the miracle. When Gabriel informed him that Allah had granted his prayer, he announced it to the Meccans. The polytheists witnessed the splitting of the moon. Muhammad shouted to the Muslims: “O Abu Salama ibn ‘Abdu’l Asad! Arqām ibn Abi’l Arqām! Bear witness!”
However, the polytheists said “The son of Abu Kabsha cast a spell on you!” Some of them also said: “If Muhammad had cast a spell on us, then he couldn't have cast a spell on everyone! Let us ask the wayfarers who came from the surrounding areas if they saw what we saw.” So when they asked the people they answered that the moon was indeed split into two. Yet, the polytheists rejected Islam. “This is a prevalent magic”, they said, “Abū Ṭālib's orphan affected the sky with his spell”. (Ṣaḥīḥ al-Bukhāri 3636, 3638)

Ḥamzah ibn ‘Abdul Muṭṭalib antagonized by Abu Jahl 
Abu Jahl passed by Muhammad at al-Ṣafā, insulted him and behaved most offensively, speaking spitefully of his religion and trying to bring him into disrepute. Muhammad did not speak to him. Now a freedwoman, belonging to 'Abdullah b. Jud'ān b. 'Amr b. Ka'b b. Sa'd b. Taym b. Murra, was in her house listening to what went on. When he went away he betook himself to the assembly of Quraysh at the Ka'ba and sat there. Within a little while Ḥamza b. 'Abdu'I Muṭṭalib arrived, with his bow hanging from his shoulder, returning from the chase, for he was fond of hunting and used to go out shooting. When he came back from a hunt he never went home until he had circumambulated the Ka'ba, and that done when he passed by an assembly of the Quraysh he stopped and saluted and talked with them. He was the strongest man of Quraysh, and the most unyielding. Hamza had headed back to his house when he passed by this woman, who asked him if he had heard of what ‘Amr b. Hisham had done just recently to his nephew, Muhammad; how he had found him sitting quietly there, and insulted him, and cursed him, and treated him badly, and that Muhammad had answered not a word. Ḥamza was filled with rage, for God purposed to honor him, so he went out at a run and did not stop to greet anyone, meaning to punish Abu Jahl when he met him. When he got to the mosque he saw him sitting among the people, and went up to him until he stood over him, when he lifted up his bow and struck him a violent blow with it, saying, 'Will you insult him when I follow his religion, and say what he says? Hit me back if you can!' Some of Banū Makhzūm got up to go to Abu Jahl's help, but he said, 'Let Abū 'Umāra alone for, by God, I insulted his nephew deeply.'

‘Ayyāsh ibn Abī Rabī‘ah held prisoner by Abu Jahl
‘Ayyāsh ibn Abī Rabī‘ah was one of the paternal cousins of ‘Amr ibn Hishām as well as his maternal brother. ‘Ayyāsh was among the early Muslim converts who emigrated to Madīnah before Muhammad. Abu Jahl devised a plan to bring him back to Makkah. Accordingly, he went to Madīnah with his brother Ḥārith and told ‘Ayyāsh a deceptive story about his mother's illness as a decoy only to provoke his emotion. Abu Jahl also lied about his mother's making an oath that she would neither sit in the shade nor comb her hair until she saw ‘Ayyāsh again. ‘Umar ibn al-Khaṭṭāb tried to warn him by saying "This is nothing but an attempt of the people to seduce you from your religion so beware of them; for, by Allah, if lice were causing your mother trouble she would use her comb, and if the heat of Mecca oppressed her she would take shelter from it." But ‘Ayyāsh said, "I will clear my mother from her oath; also I have some money there which I can get." ‘Umar told him that he was one of the richest of the Quraysh and he could have half his money if he refused to go with the two men. But when ‘Umar saw that he was determined to go he said, "If you must go, then take this camel of mine. She is well bred and easy to ride. Don't dismount, and if you suspect them of treachery you can escape on her."
The three went off and while they were on their way Abu Jahl said, "Nephew, I find my beast hard to ride. Won't you mount me behind you?" When he agreed he and they made their camels kneel to make the change over, and when on the ground they fell on him and bound him securely and brought him to Mecca by day and said, 'O men of Mecca, deal with your fools as we have dealt with this fool of ours.'

When the family of Jaḥsh migrated for Madinah 
The house of the Banu Jaḥsh was locked up when they left and ‘Utba ibn Rabī‘ah, al-‘Abbās ibn ‘Abdu’l-Muṭṭalib and Abu Jahl passed by it on their way to the upper part of Mecca. ‘Utbah looked at it with its doors blowing to and fro, empty of inhabitants, and sighed heavily and said:

“Every house however long its prosperity lasts will one day be overtaken by misfortune and trouble.”

Then 'Utbah went on to say, ‘The house of the Banu Jaḥsh has become tenantless.’ To which Abu Jahl replied, ‘Nobody will weep over that. This is the work of this man's nephew. He has divided our community, disrupted our affairs, and driven a wedge between us.’

Imposition of the Boycott 
As a means of deterring Muhammad from spreading his message, the Quraysh laid a boycott on Banū Hāshim and Banū Muṭṭalib. Abū Jahl, met Ḥakīm ibn Ḥizām with whom was a nephew carrying flour intended for his aunt Khadīja who was with him in the mountain gorge. He hung on to him and said, 'Are you taking food to the Banū Hāshim? By Allah, before you and your food move from here I will denounce you in Mecca.' Abū'l-Bakhtarī (al-‘Āṣ) ibn Hishām came to him and said, 'What is going on between you two?' When he said that Ḥakīm was taking food to the Banu Hāshim, he said: 'It is food he has which belongs to his aunt and she has sent to him about it. Are you trying to prevent him taking her own food to her? Let the man go his way'. Abū Jahl refused until they came to blows, and Abū'I-Bakhtarī (al-‘Āṣ) ibn Hishām took a camel's jaw and knocked him down, wounded him, and trod on him violently.

Abu Jahl's denial to the abrogation of the boycott 
This situation ultimately created dissension amongst the various Makkan factions, who were tied with the besieged people by blood relations. After three years of blockade and in Muharram, the tenth year of Muhammad's mission, the pact was broken. Hishām ibn ‘Amr, who used to smuggle some food to Banū Hāshim secretly at night, went to see Zuhair ibn Abu Umayyah ibn al-Mughirah, one of Abu Jahl's paternal cousins, and reproached him for resigning to that intolerable treatment meted out to his uncles in exile. The latter pleaded impotence, but agreed to work with Hisham and form a pressure group that would secure the extrication of the exiles. On the ground of motivation by uterine relations, there emerged a group of five people who set out to abrogate the pact and declare all relevant clauses null and void. They were Hishām ibn ‘Amr, Zuhair ibn Abu Umayyah ibn al-Mughirah, Al-Muṭ‘im ibn ‘Adī, Abū'l-Bakhtarī (al-‘Āṣ) ibn Hishām and Zam‘a ibn al-Aswad. They decided to meet in their assembly place and start their self-charged mission from the very precinct of the Sacred House. Zuhair, after circumambulating seven times, along with his colleagues approached the hosts of people there and rebuked them for indulging in the amenities of life whereas their kith and kin of Banū Hāshim were perishing on account of starvation and economic boycott. They swore they would never relent until the parchment of boycott was torn to pieces and the pact broken at once. Abu Jahl, standing nearby, retorted that it would never be torn. Zam‘a was infuriated and accused Abu Jahl of telling lies, adding that the pact was established and the parchment was written without seeking their approval. Abū'l-Bakhtarī intervened and backed Zam‘a. Al-Muṭ‘im bin ‘Adi and Hisham bin ‘Amr attested to the truthfulness of their two companions. Abu Jahl, with a cunning attempt to liquidate the hot argument that was running counter to his malicious goals, answered that the issue had already been resolved sometime and somewhere before. (Ar-Raheeq Al-Makhtum)

Plan of assassination 
In the end, Abu Jahl devised a plan, which he discussed with the noblemen of Quraysh in Dār al-Nadwa (a place in Makkah where the noblemen of Quraysh assembled to confer and decide on various issues) to assassinate Muhammad. Each clan should provide a young, powerful, well-born, aristocratic warrior; each of these should be provided with a sharp sword; then, each of them should strike a blow at him and kill him. Thus they would be relieved of him, and responsibility for his blood would lie upon all the clans. The Banu Hāshim could not fight them all and would have to accept the blood money which they would all contribute to.

The Hijrah of Muhammad 
At the news of Muhammad's flight with Abu Bakr, Abu Jahl rushed to the house of Abu Bakr. When interrogated, Abu Bakr's daughter Asma refused to tell him their whereabouts. Abu Jahl, in a fit rage, slapped her so hard that a few of her teeth came loose and her earring flew off.

Event with Suraqah ibn Malik 
As soon as the Quraysh realized that Muhammad had fled with Abū Bakr, they sent a cavalry including Umayyah ibn Khalaf, Abu Lahab & Abu Jahl to chase after them. In their frantic attempt to hunt them down, the Quraysh followed their trails up to Mount Thaor where Muhammad was indeed hiding inside a cave. One of the pursuers suggested checking out the cave but Umayyah ibn Khalaf jested at him and showed the intact cobweb and an undisturbed bird's nest at the mouth of the cave. Abū Jahl was the only one yet to be convinced and said, "By Lāt & ‘Uzzā, I'm sure they're holed up somewhere nearby. They must be watching us now as we look for them. Muhammad has cast a spell on our eyes so we can't see them."

Although Muhammad managed to escape for the time being, Abu Jahl would not give up and declared a bounty of 100 of the finest Arab camels for bringing him dead or alive. Suraqah ibn Malik ibn Ju’shum al-Madlajī raced after Muhammad right away. As he was gaining on them, suddenly the hooves of his stallion sagged in the desert sand and his limbs became paralyzed. So he begged him for mercy. At his entreaty, Muhammad prayed for his relief and let him get away scot-free by making a treaty of maintaining the secrecy of their whereabouts as well as warding off the other pursuers.

When Suraqah was completely certain that Muhammad had reached Madīnah, he returned to Makkah relating his miraculous incident to everyone. Since Suraqah was the leader of Banu Madlaj, Abu Jahl feared that his tribe would accept Islam influenced by this story.
 
So Abu Jahl wrote a letter to the Banu Madlaj tribe warning them of the deviation of Suraqah, despised him for his cowardice and selfishness and advised them to disobey him. Suraqah, however, replied to this letter saying, "O Abu’l Jahal! By Allah, had you witnessed how my horse got pinned into the sand, you also would not doubt the prophethood of Muhammad. I truly see that he will soon dominate all of Arabia and everyone will be his followers!"

Before the Battle of Badr 
Prior to the Battle of Badr, Sa'd ibn Mu‘ādh had visited Mecca once to perform his Umrah with his non-Muslim friend Umayyah ibn Khalaf, when they came across 'Amr. They had an argument, and as it became heated, Sa’d threatened him with stopping the Meccan trade route to Syria and 'Amr informed Umayyah that his life was threatened by Muhammad.

'Abdullah bin Mas'ud narrated:

The Meccans would not leave Muhammad at peace even in Madinah. So they sent Abu Jahl leading three hundred riders to terrorize the Muslims. Muhammad immediately dispatched a group of thirty Muhajirūn led by Ḥamza ibn ‘Abdu’l-Muṭṭalib (Ibn Sa’d, 2: 9). The two parties confronted each other on the seashore in the neighbourhood of aI-‘Īṣ (in the territory of Juhayna) standing face to face in preparation for battle. In the heat of the moment, Majdi ibn 'Amr al-Juhani intervened and compelled them to lay down their arms. He was at peace with both the parties according to a truce. So the encounter ended up without any fight. At this, Abu Jahl showed much regret in a poem composed by him and hoped for a future victory over the Muslims.

When Abu Sufyan ibn Ḥarb sent a distress message to Mecca, the Quraysh marshalled about 1,000 men for battle. Abu Jahl, on the point of his journey to Badr, grabbed the hangings (Ghilāf) of Ka’bah and made an earnest supplication to Allah that He would make whichever party was on the right side victorious.

Battle of Badr 

Abu Jahl's obstinate attitude culminated in an actual fight despite several attempts of intimidation by some Quraysh leaders.

Al-Juḥfa Juhaym ibn al-Ṣalt ibn Makhrama ibn al-Muṭṭalib tried to intimidate the Quraysh belligerents from going into battle based on an ominous vision. But Abū Jahl sardonically replied, "Here's another prophet from Banū al-Muṭṭalib! He'll know tomorrow if we meet them who is going to be killed!"

When Abū Sufyān ibn Ḥarb saw that he had saved his caravan he sent word to Quraysh, "Since you came out to save your caravan, your men, and your property, and God has delivered them, go back." But Abū Jahl said, "By Allah, we will not go back until we have been to Badr." Badr is the site of one of the Arab fairs where they used to hold a market every year. "We will spend three days there, slaughter camels and feast and drink, wine, and the girls shall play for us. The Arabs will hear that we have come and gathered together, and will respect us in future. So come on!"

Ḥakīm ibn Ḥizām tried to restrain ‘Utbah ibn Rabī‘ah from going to battle based on the report gathered by 'Umayr b. Wahb al-Jumaḥī. On ‘Utbah's counsel, Ḥakīm approached Abu Jahl so that he might put him off. But Abu Jahl scorned his advice by saying, "By Allah, his lungs are swollen (with fear) when he saw Muhammad and his companions. No, by Allah, we will not turn back until Allah decides between us and Muhammad. ‘Utba does not believe his own words, but he saw that Muhammad and his companions are (in number as) the eaters of one slaughtered camel, and his son (i.e. Abū Ḥudhayfa ibn ‘Utbah) is among them, so he is afraid lest you slay him."

Death 
Abu Jahl was fatally wounded in the Battle of Badr by Mu'adh ibn ‘Afrā’ and Mu'ādh ibn 'Amr, but was finally killed by Abdullah ibn Masud.

'Abdur-Rahman bin 'Auf narrated:

Mu'ādh ibn 'Amr ibn al-Jamūḥ said, "I heard the people saying when Abu Jahl was in a sort of thicket, 'Abu' jahal cannot be got at'. When I heard that I made it my business, and made for him. When I got within striking distance I fell upon him and fetched him a blow which sent his foot and half his shank flying. I can only liken it to a date-stone flying from the pestle when it is beaten. His son ‘Ikrima struck me on the shoulder and severed my arm and it hung by the skin from my side, and the battle compelled me to leave him. I fought the whole of the day dragging my arm behind me and when it became painful to me I put my foot on it and standing on it I tore it off." He lived after that into the reign of 'Uthmān.

Mu‘awwidh ibn ‘Afrā’ passed Abū Jahl as he lay there helpless and smote him until he left him at his last gasp. He himself went on fighting until he was killed. Then 'Abdullah ibn Mas'ūd passed by Abū Jahl when the Apostle had ordered that he was to be searched for among the slain. 'Abdullah ibn Mas'ūd said that he found him at his last gasp and put his foot on his neck and said to him: "Has God put you to shame?" He replied, "How has He shamed me? Am I anything more remarkable than a man you have killed? Tell me how the battle went." He told him that it went in favor of Allah and His apostle. Abu Jahl said, "You have climbed high, you little shepherd." Then ['Abdullah ibn Mas'ūd] struck off his head and showed his head to Muhammad. When Muhammad saw his lifeless body on the battlefield he said, "This is the Pharaoh of this Ummah."

Upon his death, the people of Quraysh mourned for him and composed elegies and requiems depicting him as a noble, generous and glorified man.

Quranic verses related to Abu Jahl 
‘Abdullah ibn ‘Abbās says that 84 verses of the Quran were revealed regarding Abu Jahl.

Then Abu Jahl came up to him saying, “Should I not stop you from this?!” So the Messenger rebuked him and warned him to stop harassing him. Abu Jahl then told the Prophet, “Do you threaten me when you know very well that I have the most backing and support than anyone in this valley of Makkah?”  Allah then revealed:

9. Do you not see the one who forbids?

10. A slave when he (turns to Allah) to pray?

11. Don't you see if he is on (the road of) Guidance?-

12. Or enjoins Righteousness?

13. Don't you see if he denies (Truth) and turns away?

14. Does he not know that Allah sees him?

15. Let him beware! If he does not stop, We will drag him by the forelock

16. A lying, sinful forelock!

17. Then, let him call (for help) to his council (of comrades):

18. We will call on the angels of punishment (to deal with him)!

19. Nay, heed him not: But bow down in adoration, and bring yourself the closer (to Allah)!  (Sūrah al-`Alaq, 96: 9-19)
Abu Jahl then backed off hearing these lines. Ibn ‘Abbās says that if Abu Jahl had called his gang to hurt the Messenger, then Allah would have sent upon him the angels of punishment to deal with him.

Suratul An'am: 108 
Once Abu Jahl said to the prophet, ‘By Allah, Muhammad, you will either stop cursing our gods, or we will curse the God you serve.’ So Allah revealed concerning that, “Curse not those to whom they pray other than God lest they curse God wrongfully through lack of knowledge.” (Sura 6:108)

Sura Dukhan: 43 
When Allah mentioned the tree of al-Zaqqūm to strike terror into the Quraysh, Abu Jahl asked them, “O Quraysh, do you know what the tree of al Zaqqūm is with which Muhammad would scare you?” When they said that they did not, he said: “It is Yathrib dates buttered. By Allah, if we get hold of them we will gulp them down in one!”  So Allah sent down the following verse: 
“Verily the tree of al-Zaqqūm is the food of the sinner like molten brass seething in their bellies like boiling water.” (Sūra 44: 43)

Sura Anfal: 33-34 
Narrated Anas bin Malik: Abu Jahl said, "O Allah! If this (Quran) is indeed the Truth from You, then rain down on us a shower of stones from the sky or bring on us a painful torment." So Allah revealed: "But Allah would not punish them while you were amongst them, nor He will punish them while they seek (Allah's) forgiveness..." (8.33) And why Allah should not punish them while they turn away (men) from Al-Masjid-al-Haram (the Sacred Mosque of Mecca)..." (8.33-34)

Sura Ma'un: 2-3 

Abu Jahl was infamous for his ruthless attitude toward orphans as well. 'Amr, who was a custodian of an orphan, refused to return his belongings once he asked for and drove him away. Allah sent down Sūra Mā‘ūn (107:2-3) regarding this act of cruelty.

See also
List of expeditions of Muhammad

References

Banu Makhzum
People killed at the Battle of Badr
556 births
624 deaths
Year of birth unknown
Place of birth unknown
7th-century Arabs
Opponents of Muhammad